Jason Rosenfield (born 1945, New York City) is an American film editor, writer, director, producer and educator known mostly for his work in story-driven feature-length documentaries. Elected to membership in American Cinema Editors., an honorary society of distinguished editors, he has earned multiple Emmy Awards for his work and contributed to numerous additional awards, including an Emmy Award and three nominations, an Academy Award nomination, a Peabody and R.F. Kennedy Award.

Early life

Raised in New Rochelle, N.Y. and introduced to painting, jazz and musical theater as a child, Rosenfield was inspired to pursue a career in the arts. He attended the University of Pennsylvania until his father's death forced him to leave to help support his family. Eventually moving into New York's Greenwich Village and its dynamic mix of dancers, performance artists and filmmakers, he focused on dance before injuries and a fortuitous part-time job introduced him to film editing, which he saw as a natural extension of dance and choreography. While experimenting with cinematic form on his own, Rosenfield took freelance jobs assisting senior editors in television commercials and nonfiction programming, finally joining the Motion Picture Editors Guild in 1979 and pursuing a full-time career.

Career

Rosenfield earned his first major feature credit with Robert Altman’s Come Back to the 5 & Dime Jimmy Dean, Jimmy Dean and first documentary credit with Perry Miller Adato’s DGA Award-winning Eugene O’Neill: A Glory of Ghosts before moving to Los Angeles in 1989. Arnold Shapiro’s The American Dream Contest and Arthur Barron’s Rita Hayworth: Dancing Into the Dream was followed in 1992 by his debut as a director, writer, and producer of a theatrical short for the World Wildlife Fund, The Kingdom, which earned him a Cine Golden Eagle Award and Cindy Writing Award. He followed this as editor, writer and co-producer of Discovery Channel’s To Be With Sharks, then wrote, directed and produced On Nature’s Trail, an award-winning series of three short fictional children’s films for National Geographic.

Between 1994 and 1997, Rosenfield edited a number of films for Half-Court Pictures’ Bill Guttentag and Vince DiPersio, including the Oscar-nominated Blues Highway and Emmy Award-winning HBO films Memphis PD and Teen Killers, before joining R. J. Cutler’s Emmy Award-winning series American High for Fox and PBS. Rosenfield continued his work in television series with Bunim-Murray’s 10th season of The Real World, followed by Bill Guttentag and Dick Wolf’s Law & Order: Crime & Punishment, which ran for two seasons on NBC. Two years later he served as lead editor for Rob Roy Thomas’ improvisational TV comedy Free Ride.

In 2001, Rosenfield was elected to membership in American Cinema Editors (ACE), an honorary society of distinguished editors, one of a handful of documentary editors to be so honored. He has since held an active role in ACE, serving as Associate Director of the ACE Board from 2012 to 2015 and on the Membership and Eddy Awards Blue Ribbon Committees.

As Rosenfield's acclamation in the industry rose, his influence expanded beyond the editing room. Beginning in 2006, Rosenfield served three terms on the Academy of Television Arts and Sciences Board of Governors, helping spearhead the annual Prime Cuts Emmy-adjacent symposiums and developing numerous special events, including "Transparent: Anatomy of an Episode," with Jill Soloway and hosted by J. J. Abrams. He spent almost two decades on the Academy's Picture Editors and Documentary Peer Groups Executive Committees.

Rosenfield's credits expanded further over the next decade with many award-winning documentaries. In 2004, he co-edited Black Sky: Burt Rutan's Race for Space, which won a Peabody Award. In 2007 and 2010, respectively, he edited Vince DiPersio's Semper Fi and the Emmy-nominated The Kennedy Detail. Between 2012 and 2014 Rosenfield collaborated with Joshua Rofé and three-time Oscar winner Mark Jonathan Harris on Rofe's feature-length documentaries Lost for Life  and Swift Current, followed in 2016 by Harris’  Breaking Point: The War for Democracy in Ukraine. In 2018 he joined Rofe and Oscar winner Jordan Peele’s four-part Amazon series Lorena as supervising editor. Lorena received an IDA Award nomination and premiered at the 2019 Sundance Film Festival. Other honored documentaries credits include Living Undocumented and The Seventies.

Rosenfield's experience in the editing room proved to be a catalyst for the mentorship and influence he would provide as a story and editorial consultant. Brett Fallentine's award-winning  story of Compton's African-American cowboys, Fire on the Hill, initiated Rosenfield's consulting career in 2017 (he eventually received a full editing credit). That same year, Rosenfield consulted and served as supervising editor on Apo Bazidi's award-winning Resistance is Life, the story of an eight-year old Kurdish refugee fleeing ISIS. In 2018, his consulting credits included Do No Harm, Emmy winner Robyn Symon's investigative look into physician burnout, and Amelia Rose Blaire's award-winning narrative short Desert Prayer (for which he also received an editing credit). In 2019 he consulted on Ian Cheney’s Picture a Scientist, which was selected for the 2020 Tribeca Film Festival, Apo Bazidi’s How Far is Home, a story of Syrian refugees in America’s heartland that premiered at the 2020 Cleveland International Film Festival, and Academy Award winner Mitchell Block’s Sara, still in post-production.

In 2016, Rosenfield joined the faculty at USC’s prestigious School of Cinematic Arts, mentoring graduate and undergraduate students through both fiction and documentary productions. He is a recurrent guest lecturer at various film schools, including ShanghaiTech University and Chapman University. In 2015, the Stowe (Vt.) Story Labs Screenwriting Workshop recruited Rosenfield as the first picture editor to serve as mentor to burgeoning screenwriters. In 2017, Rosenfield was selected by the U.S. State Department’s American FIlm Showcase to lead international workshops on editing and storytelling.

In 2018, Rosenfield received his MFA in Film from the Vermont College of Fine Arts, delivering as his thesis project a manuscript for his memoir "Chasing the Monster: Confessions of a Film Editor," chronicling his career and life at the crossroads between art and artist. Rosenfield continues his career as an educator, film editor, consultant and writer. He is developing a documentary film based on his memoir with movie director Robert Townsend, and an online college curriculum for film students in collaboration with Peter Hawley, former Dean of Columbia College Hollywood and current Director of the Illinois Film Office

Filmography

Editor: Feature Documentaries

Editor: Television Series

Documentary

Reality

Comedy

Editor: Narrative Films

Director

Writer

Producer

Awards

Individual

Production

References

New Article - Jason Rosenfield 

1945 births
Living people